Romen Ghosh is an Indian sportsman who represented India in several badminton tournaments in the 1960s and 1970s.

Ghosh was a member of the Indian badminton team, which won the 1975 Thomas Cup qualification by defeating Pakistan at Lahore.
He received the Arjuna award for badminton in 1974.

See also
Dipu Ghosh

References

External links 

Indian male badminton players
Indian national badminton champions
Recipients of the Arjuna Award
Living people
Asian Games medalists in badminton
Badminton players at the 1974 Asian Games
Asian Games bronze medalists for India
Medalists at the 1974 Asian Games
Commonwealth Games competitors for India
Badminton players at the 1970 British Commonwealth Games
1942 births